Wuthering Heights is a 1970 film directed by Robert Fuest and starring Anna Calder-Marshall and Timothy Dalton. It is based on the classic 1847 Emily Brontë novel of the same name. Like the 1939 version, it depicts only the first sixteen chapters concluding with Catherine Earnshaw Linton's death and omits the trials of her daughter, Hindley's son, and Heathcliff's son.

Plot summary

Cast
 Anna Calder-Marshall as Catherine Earnshaw Linton
 Timothy Dalton as Heathcliff
 Harry Andrews as Mr. Earnshaw
 Pamela Brown as Mrs. Linton
 Judy Cornwell as Nelly Dean
 James Cossins as Mr. Linton
 Rosalie Crutchley as Mrs. Earnshaw
 Hilary Dwyer as Isabella Linton
 Julian Glover as Hindley Earnshaw
 Hugh Griffith as Dr. Kenneth
 Morag Hood as Frances Earnshaw
 Ian Ogilvy as Edgar Linton
 Peter Sallis as Mr. Shielders

Hindley Earnshaw
This film version differs from the book in several ways, and most of the differences involve Hindley Earnshaw. First it takes a more sympathetic look at Hindley. Usually portrayed as being a cruel oppressor of Heathcliff, in this version he is persecuted by his father and lives in Heathcliff's shadow. Also in this version, Nelly Dean, the narrator, is shown as being in love with Hindley and unable to express her feelings due to their class difference. After his wife's death, Hindley goes through a hedonistic stage but finally pulls himself out of it.

At the end of the film, perhaps the most controversial of all the differences, Hindley succeeds in fatally shooting Heathcliff and remains the owner of Wuthering Heights. Heathcliff and Cathy's ghosts are then reunited.

When first introducing Heathcliff, the film also suggests that Heathcliff might be Mr Earnshaw's illegitimate son and hence Cathy's half-brother.

Production
AIP were not traditionally associated with Gothic romance, but were inspired to make the film by the success of Romeo and Juliet (1968).

The movie was shot on location in Blubberhouses, Weston Hall near Otley, and Brimham Rocks. Producer Lous Heyward said at the time:
I'm the only American here. For the first time in 30 years Hollywood said to me, 'No big names, no huge publicity, just a good film that stands on its merits'. This is very encouraging except now we stand naked in judgement. It has to be really good with two to three million dollars invested. The last version, with Laurence Olivier as Heathcliff and Merle Oberon as Cathy, portrayed him as a regular nice guy and her as sweetness and light. That was not the truth and Hollywood now goes in for the truth. Heathcliff was a bastard and Cathy a real bitch and that's how they'll be in this film.

Reception
Vincent Canby of The New York Times remarked that the film "is simply petulant when it tries to be overwrought, which may be what American International Pictures publicity people mean when they describe the film as 'youth-oriented.'" Variety called it "a competent, tasteful, frequently even lovely re-adaptation of Emily Bronte's Gothic, mystical love story. But the brooding tension, the electric passion of two lovers compelled to an inevitable tragedy is not generated." Gene Siskel of the Chicago Tribune gave the film one star out of four and wrote that the actors "are simply not equal to the demands of the script that, if not controlled, easily slips into laughable melodrama", adding that "the film has the unfortunate physical appearance of a vampire tale."

Kevin Thomas of the Los Angeles Times stated, "At the tag end of 1970, the sight of Emily Bronte's Cathy Earnshaw running all over those Yorkshire moors shouting Heathcliff! Heathcliff! seems supremely silly—at least in AIP's handsome new version of 'Wuthering Heights' ... The trouble is that it's impossible to care about any of these people, so self-indulgent are they in their romanticism. As a result, you come away from the film thinking how much healthier and honest are today's young people, the audience for which this picture presumably is intended." Gary Arnold of The Washington Post panned the film as "inane and incoherent", with "such a tenuous, sickly resemblance to the book it's based on (and whose reputation it's confiscating) that, in simple justice, the producers should be restrained from using the original title. Some of the film characters have the same names as Miss Bronte's characters, but the resemblance ceases right about there: her story, her atmosphere and her emotions are almost totally ignored, bungled or butchered." David Pirie of The Monthly Film Bulletin wrote, "At the very least, the combination of AIP and Emily Brontë promises a creative tension; but it turns out to provide only a flattened and monotonous version of her classic novel ... they have played safe in the worst possible way, reducing and telescoping the action into a meagre, spiritless soap-opera, with everyone lacking conviction and Heathcliff in particular about as demonic as a shy farm-hand."

The film holds a score of 50% on Rotten Tomatoes based on 6 reviews.

AIP had announced a sequel Return to Wuthering Heights but it was not made. Neither were other adaptations of classic novels mooted by the studio, including Camille, The House of Seven Gables, and Tale of Two Cities.

Accolades

References

External links
 
 

1970 films
1970s fantasy films
1970 romantic drama films
American International Pictures films
British drama films
Films scored by Michel Legrand
Films based on Wuthering Heights
Films directed by Robert Fuest
Films set in the 19th century
Films set in Yorkshire
Films shot in Yorkshire
1970s English-language films
1970s British films